Pterygia jeanjacquesi is a species of sea snail, a marine gastropod mollusk, in the family Mitridae, the miters or miter snails.

Description
The length of the shell attains 12 mm.

Distribution
This marine species occurs off Madagascar.

References

 Bozzetti, L., 2010. Pterygia jeanjacquesi (Gastropoda: Hypsogastropoda: Mitridae) nuova specie dal Madagascar meridionale. Malacologia Mostra Mondiale 68: 14-15

External links
 Fedosov A., Puillandre N., Herrmann M., Kantor Yu., Oliverio M., Dgebuadze P., Modica M.V. & Bouchet P. (2018). The collapse of Mitra: molecular systematics and morphology of the Mitridae (Gastropoda: Neogastropoda). Zoological Journal of the Linnean Society. 183(2): 253-337

jeanjacquesi
Gastropods described in 2010